Venni Vetti Vecci is the debut studio album by American rapper Ja Rule. It was released on June 1, 1999, by Def Jam Recordings and Irv Gotti's Murder Inc. Records. It was the first album to be released on Murder Inc. Production was mostly handled by Irv Gotti (who also executive produced the album), with additional work provided by Lil Rob, Ty Fyffe, Erick Sermon and Self Service. The album features guest appearances from Jay-Z, DMX, Case, Memphis Bleek, Black Child, Ronald Isley and Erick Sermon, among others. The album title alludes to the Latin phrase "veni, vidi, vici", meaning "I came, I saw, I conquered".

Venni Vetti Vecci was released on June 1, 1999, debuting at number 3 on the US Billboard 200 and selling 184,000 copies in its first week. The album was supported by one successful single, "Holla Holla", peaking at number 35 on the US Billboard Hot 100 singles chart.

Background
In 1995, Ja Rule was one of the first artists to be featuring on Mic Geronimo's "Time to Build". He then formed a group named "Cash Money Click" with his friends. The group then signed a deal to TVT Records. Under their association to TVT Records, the group recorded two albums, releasing one single, upon being dropped from the label. Ja Rule called it a "bullshit deal" as TVT withheld the publishing royalties of the recorded material.  Irv Gotti was hired as an A&R while working as an executive producer for Def Jam, and convinced Ja Rule to sign a deal with the label.

Russell Simmons later allowed Gotti to have his own record label. Irv promoted and Ja Rule in 1997, founding Murder Inc. Records, placing him on songs amongst rappers Jay-Z, LL Cool J, DMX, Method Man and Redman. Due to Ja Rule's exceptional performances on these songs, according to Def Jam; the representatives from the label it gave this album a release date.

Title
The album title, Venni Vetti Vecci, refers to the Latin phrase "veni, vidi, vici", which means "I came, I saw, I conquered".

Music
The track titled "Only Begotten Son" alludes to the biblical verses John 3:16 and John 3:18, in which signifying "the father so feared the world that he left his only begotten son, in order to show that pain is love".

Artwork
The album cover of Venni Vetti Vecci features Ja Rule with his head turned upward, eyes closed and hands clasped together, standing in front of a white statue of Jesus. It has been interpreted as referring to the "only begotten son" metaphor.

Critical reception

Upon its release, Venni Vetti Vecci received generally mixed reviews. Ja Rule received several comparisons to fellow rappers Tupac Shakur and DMX. Writing for Vibe magazine, Shaheem Reid felt that the majority of the album was "hampered by colorless production", stating that Ja Rule "desperately needs tighter tracks to complement his MC skills".

Commercial performance
Venni Vetti Vecci debuted at number 3 on the US Billboard 200, selling 185,000 copies in its first week. The album became a certified platinum by the Recording Industry Association of America (RIAA). In November 2002, the album had sold 2 million copies worldwide.

Aftermath
Ja Rule became one of the biggest hip hop stars, along with Jay-Z and DMX. With their albums, Vol. 2... Hard Knock Life and It's Dark and Hell Is Hot, which all gained notoriety and multi-platinum sales. Because of these albums, Ja Rule was able to tour with these artists as they formed a group titled, Murder Inc., who fittingly signed to Murder Inc. and Def Jam. He was an opening act for Jay-Z and DMX on the 1998's "Hard Knock Life" tour, along with Memphis Bleek. The success of the album led to the credibility for Irv Gotti as a producer. The album, produced by Gotti was also overseen by Chris Lighty and Violator Management, one of the companies that Ja Rule developed issues with.

Track listing
Credits adapted from the album's liner notes.

 (co.) Co-producer

Personnel
Credits for Venni Vetti Vecci adapted from Allmusic.

 Rodney "Darkchild" Jerkins – vocals
 Bob Brown – mixing
 Tom Coyne – mastering
 DMX – performer
 Glen E. Friedman – photography
 Tyrone Fyffe – producer
 Irv Gotti – executive producer, mixing
 Ronald Isley – performer
 Self Service – producer

 Ja Rule – vocals, rap
 Jay-Z – performer
 Lil Rob – multi instruments, producer
 Jonathan Mannion – photography
 Memphis Bleek – performer
 Erick Sermon – producer, performer
 Tommy Uzzo – engineer
 Patrick Viala – engineer

Sequel
In 2008, Ja Rule released the mixtape titled The Atkins Files, Vol. 1. The mixtape was a comeback, after the long-awaited from his album The Mirror. In this mixtape, he explains his plans on releasing a sequel to Venni Vetti Vecci.

Chart positions

Weekly charts

Year-end charts

Certifications

See also
 List of number-one R&B albums of 1999 (U.S.)

References

1999 debut albums
Albums recorded at Electric Lady Studios
Def Jam Recordings albums
Ja Rule albums